Nordfjord Folkeblad was a Norwegian newspaper, published in Måløy in Sogn og Fjordane county.

History and profile
The paper was started in 1933 as the Liberal Party organ in outer Nordfjord, in competition with the conservative Fjordenes Tidende. To beat its competitor, it was soon expanded from two to three editions a week. It was edited by Per Osdal from 1933, then by J. M. Steffensen from 1936 until the newspaper was stopped in 1940 during the occupation of Norway by Nazi Germany. It resumed in 1948, but finally went defunct after its last issue on 5 January 1952.

References

1933 establishments in Norway
1952 disestablishments in Norway
Defunct newspapers published in Norway
Liberal Party (Norway) newspapers
Norwegian-language newspapers
Publications established in 1933
Publications disestablished in 1940
Publications established in 1948
Publications disestablished in 1952
Mass media in Sogn og Fjordane
Vågsøy